Hangzhou GreatStar Industrial Co., Ltd. is an industrial conglomerate based in Hangzhou, China. It primarily produces hand tools and power tools.

Subsidiaries include Hangzhou Equipment Holdings and GreatStar Tools USA. The GreatStar Tools USA division president is Gary DuBoff.

Brands
 Arrow Fastener (acquired 2017)
 DuraTech hand and power tools
 EverBrite personal lighting
 Goldblatt masonry tools (acquired 2010)
 LISTA warehouse equipment (acquired 2018)
 Millers Falls Company (acquired 2002)
 Pony Jorgensen woodworking clamps (acquired 2016)
 Prime-Line window and door hardware (acquired 2019)
 SK Hand Tools (acquired 2021)
 Sheffield Tools (domestic market only)
 Shop-Vac wet/dry vacuum cleaners (acquired 2020)
 Swiss+Tech multi-tools
 WORKPRO hand and power tools (since 2002)

References

External links
  
  

Hand tools
Companies based in Hangzhou
Conglomerate companies of China